The Married Flapper is a 1922 American comedy film directed by Stuart Paton and written by Doris Schroeder. The film stars Marie Prevost, Kenneth Harlan, Philo McCullough, Frank Kingsley, Lucille Ricksen, and Kathleen O'Connor. The film was released on July 31, 1922, by Universal Film Manufacturing Company.

Cast          
Marie Prevost as Pamela Billings
Kenneth Harlan as Bill Billings
Philo McCullough as Glenn Kingdonn
Frank Kingsley as Oliver Holbrook
Lucille Ricksen as Carolyn Carter
Kathleen O'Connor as Gwen Barker
Hazel Keener as Muriel Vane
Tom McGuire as John Holbrook
Burton S. Wilson as Robert Mills 
William Quinn as 'Wild Ben' Clark
Lydia Yeamans Titus as Mrs. Brewer 
Martha Mattox as Aunt Libby

References

External links

 

1922 films
1920s English-language films
Silent American comedy films
Universal Pictures films
Films directed by Stuart Paton
American silent feature films
American black-and-white films
1922 comedy films
1920s American films